Olpuch Wdzydze is a PKP railway station in Olpuch, Pomeranian Voivodeship, Poland.

Lines crossing the station

References 
Olpuch Wdzydze article at Polish Stations Database, URL accessed at 7 March 2006

Railway stations in Pomeranian Voivodeship
Kościerzyna County